Cooksville is a neighbourhood in the city of Mississauga, Regional Municipality of Peel, in the Greater Toronto Area region of Ontario, Canada. It is centred around the intersection of Dundas Street and Hurontario Street near the eponymous Cooksville Creek.

History
Cooksville was originally located in Toronto Township, and was an important stage coach stop along the Dundas highway, which was carved out of the wilderness after a survey by Asa Danforth Jr. in 1798.

The settlement was originally named Harrisville in honour of Daniel Harris, Cooksville's first settler, who immigrated from the United States in 1807. Later in 1836, the settlement was renamed to the present name Cooksville after Jacob Cook.

The entrepreneur, Jacob Cook, won the contract to deliver mail from York to Niagara, operated several stage coach lines, was the local magistrate and built the Cooksville House, the first licensed tavern in the area at the northwest corner of Dundas and Hurontario streets in 1829. A heritage Mississauga sign on Hurontario Street north of the intersection claims it was the first Canadian location of winemaking in 1836.

Cooksville grew in size and influence until the Great Fire of 1852 razed much of it. That year, the McClelland-Copeland General store opened and is now the areas longest surviving building.
A severe tornado hit the area on June 24, 1923, destroying mostly rural farmhouses around the town. On the west side of the town there was a 182 acre brickyard that sprawled south of the CP rail line from 1912 until its closure in 1995, employing many Cooksville residents over that period. The Italian Heavyweight champion boxer, Primo Carnera had worked at the yard for a short period during his youth. Today, the redeveloped site is a medium density residential and retail zone along Shoreline Dr., just south of the infamous 1979 Mississauga train derailment site at the CP crossing (Mavis Road).

Cooksville was the residence of HIH Grand Duchess Olga Alexandrovna of Russia while in exile in Canada.

Although never incorporated and not being the city's largest historic community, its central crossroads location meant much of the early suburban growth in Mississauga (Toronto Township before 1967) occurred in the area around Cooksville. For much of that time it had the highest concentration of high-rise condominium and rental buildings in Mississauga, and was originally proposed to be the location of Mississauga's city centre. However, lobbying by prominent developer Bruce McLaughlin to build a new municipal office after a fire in 1969 badly damaged the original township hall and the opening of Square One Shopping Centre to the north, resulted in the city centre overtaking it in density.

Transportation

Cooksville is a main transportation hub in Mississauga, with GO Transit rail, and bus service; and express city buses to Toronto's Union Station. Cooksville GO Station is  just north of the intersection of Dundas and Hurontario Streets, the original centre of Cooksville.

Dundas Street, a four-lane road; and Hurontario Street, a six-lane road, are the main thoroughfares in Cooksville, and intersect at the heart of the community. Locally this intersection was known as, and still often referred to by locals as "Five and Ten" in reference to those street's previous provincial highway numbers (Highway 5 for Dundas Street, Highway 10 for Hurontario Street).

Demographics
According to the Canada 2016 Census

There is a plethora of South Asian and Arab textile/clothing shops, restaurants, and grocery stores in the area. There is also a significant number of Afro-Caribbean take-out restaurants and barber shops; the area is known to cater towards Mississauga's black community because of the large number of barber shops in close proximity to one another. Nevertheless, the area is multicultural and most cultures are represented in the area.

The census tracts for the area, include three separate neighbourhood designations by the City of Mississauga: Cooksville NHD (Neighbourhood), DT Cooksville (Downtown) and DT Hospital (site of the large Mississauga Hospital).
The area in the southwest part of Cooksville, closer to the Credit River, is a more exclusive enclave of mostly large, detached homes on larger, treed lots; is referred to as Gordon Woods. Fairview is sometimes considered to be part of Cooksville, but is actually the neighbourhood located north of the CP rail line/Cooksville GO Station.

Notes

References

Neighbourhoods in Mississauga